Masakazu Kuramochi    (born February 7, 1972) is a Japanese retired mixed martial artist. He competed in the Lightweight division. Kurmochi was a veteran of every major Japanese mixed martial arts promotion with the exception of PRIDE. In 2008 Kuramochi later retired from contact sports and opened up his own video game arcade in Tokyo.

Mixed martial arts record

|-
| Loss
| align=center| 4-12-2
| Yukio Sakaguchi
| KO (soccer kick)
| Pancrase: Shining 5
| 
| align=center| 1
| align=center| 2:01
| Tokyo, Japan
| 
|-
| Loss
| align=center| 4-11-2
| Yuki Ito
| TKO (punches)
| Deep: Oyaji Deep
| 
| align=center| 1
| align=center| 4:58
| Tokyo, Japan
| 
|-
| Loss
| align=center| 4-10-2
| Takuya Wada
| Decision (unanimous)
| Pancrase: 2005 Neo-Blood Tournament Finals
| 
| align=center| 2
| align=center| 5:00
| Tokyo, Japan
| 
|-
| Loss
| align=center| 4-9-2
| Takafumi Ito
| KO (punch)
| Pancrase: Spiral 1
| 
| align=center| 1
| align=center| 3:30
| Tokyo, Japan
| 
|-
| Loss
| align=center| 4-8-2
| Koji Oishi
| TKO (punches)
| Pancrase: Brave 6
| 
| align=center| 2
| align=center| 4:13
| Tokyo, Japan
| 
|-
| Win
| align=center| 4-7-2
| Hideo Ota
| Decision (unanimous)
| GCM: Demolition Atom 6
| 
| align=center| 2
| align=center| 5:00
| Tokyo, Japan
| 
|-
| Draw
| align=center| 3-7-2
| Takaichi Hirayama
| Draw
| GCM: Demolition 030923
| 
| align=center| 2
| align=center| 5:00
| Japan
| 
|-
| Loss
| align=center| 3-7-1
| Kenichiro Togashi
| Submission (armbar)
| Shooto: Treasure Hunt 6
| 
| align=center| 1
| align=center| 4:31
| Tokyo, Japan
| 
|-
| Loss
| align=center| 3-6-1
| Mitsuhiro Ishida
| Decision (unanimous)
| Shooto: Treasure Hunt 1
| 
| align=center| 2
| align=center| 5:00
| Tokyo, Japan
| 
|-
| Win
| align=center| 3-5-1
| Takuhito Hida
| Decision (majority)
| Shooto: To The Top 10
| 
| align=center| 2
| align=center| 5:00
| Tokyo, Japan
| 
|-
| Loss
| align=center| 2-5-1
| Yohei Suzuki
| Decision (unanimous)
| Shooto: Gig East 5
| 
| align=center| 2
| align=center| 5:00
| Tokyo, Japan
| 
|-
| Loss
| align=center| 2-4-1
| Masato Fujiwara
| TKO (cut)
| Shooto: Gig East 1
| 
| align=center| 1
| align=center| 1:01
| Tokyo, Japan
| 
|-
| Loss
| align=center| 2-3-1
| Hiroshi Tsuruya
| Submission (armbar)
| Shooto: R.E.A.D. 1
| 
| align=center| 1
| align=center| 1:51
| Tokyo, Japan
| 
|-
| Draw
| align=center| 2-2-1
| Kohei Yasumi
| Draw
| Shooto: Renaxis 4
| 
| align=center| 2
| align=center| 5:00
| Tokyo, Japan
| 
|-
| Win
| align=center| 2-2
| Takaharu Murahama
| Decision (majority)
| Shooto: Las Grandes Viajes 3
| 
| align=center| 2
| align=center| 5:00
| Tokyo, Japan
| 
|-
| Win
| align=center| 1-2
| Mitsuo Matsumoto
| Decision (unanimous)
| Shooto: Gig '98 1st
| 
| align=center| 2
| align=center| 5:00
| Tokyo, Japan
| 
|-
| Loss
| align=center| 0-2
| Takuya Kuwabara
| Decision (split)
| Shooto: Vale Tudo Junction 3
| 
| align=center| 3
| align=center| 3:00
| Tokyo, Japan
| 
|-
| Loss
| align=center| 0-1
| Yuki Nakai
| Submission (heel hook)
| Shooto: Shooto
| 
| align=center| 2
| align=center| 1:36
| Tokyo, Japan
|

See also
List of male mixed martial artists

References

External links
 
 Masakazu Kuramochi at mixedmartialarts.com
 Masakazu Kuramochi at fightmatrix.com

1972 births
Japanese male mixed martial artists
Lightweight mixed martial artists
Living people
Sportspeople from Tokyo
People from Bunkyō